Polygala boykinii, known by the common name Boykin's milkwort, is a species of flowering plant. It grows to about 2 feet high and produces a spear of white flowers. It is a dicot in the Polygalaceae family. It has been collected in Florida and Alabama.

References

boykinii
Flora of the Southeastern United States
Flora without expected TNC conservation status